Jarocice  is a village in the administrative district of Gmina Burzenin, within Sieradz County, Łódź Voivodeship, in central Poland.

The village has a population of 167.

References

Jarocice